Benjamin Joseph Hawker (born 29 November 1975) is a New Zealand film director and special effects artist.

Early life
Hawker was born in Lincoln, Christchurch. He attended Killara High School in Sydney, Australia and graduated from the National Institute of Dramatic Art (NIDA) in 1995.

Career
Hawker is best known for his work in special effects as a creature and make-up effects artist, predominantly in association with Weta Workshop on The Lord of the Rings film trilogy. Hawker has directed music videos for New Zealand musicians, Louis Baker and Thomas Oliver. His first feature film was Blackspot, which was released in New Zealand on July 15, 2009 following festival screenings in Europe and the United States. He has also directed numerous short films and the 2015 documentary series, Building Gallipoli for New Zealand's National Museum, Te Papa Tongarewa.

Filmography

Blackspot (2008) - Director
Building Gallipoli (2015) - Director

Art Direction
Ghost in the Shell (2017) - Weta Workshop Design

Special effects
Avatar (2009) - Prop design
District 9 (2009) - Creature effects
30 Days of Night (2007) - Prosthetic effects
The Chronicles of Narnia: The Lion, the Witch and the Wardrobe (2005): Sculptor / designer
King Kong (2005) - Creature designer
Peter Pan (2003) - Sculptor / Puppeteer
The Last Samurai (2003) - Prosthetic effects
Perfect Strangers (2003) - Prosthetic effects
The Lord of the Rings: The Return of the King (2003) - Creature designer
The Lord of the Rings: The Two Towers (2002) - Creature effects
The Lord of the Rings: The Fellowship of the Ring (2001) - Prosthetic effects
Babe: Pig in the City (1998) - Special effects technician

References

External links

New Zealand film directors
1975 births
Living people